"Look What God Gave Her" is a song recorded by American country music singer Thomas Rhett. He wrote the song with his father Rhett Akins, Julian Bunetta, Josh Ryan, Jacob Kasher and Ammar Malik, and co-produced it with Dann Huff and Julian Bunetta. It is the first single from Rhett's fourth studio album, Center Point Road.

Commercial performance
The song was released for download on February 28, 2019. It was the best-selling country digital song of the week with 19,000 copies sold in its first week, which moved the song up to number 5 from 35 on Hot Country Songs chart dated March 16, 2019. It was certified Gold by the RIAA for 500,000 units in combined sales and streams on October 9, 2019, and has sold 210,000 copies as of December 2019. By August 2021, it was certified 2× Platinum for sales of an equivalent of 2,000,000 units.

Music video
The music video was released on April 6, 2019 and directed by T.K. McKamy. Thomas Rhett's inspiration for the song was his wife, Lauren Atkins, who joins him in the video. His two daughters, Willa Gray and Ada James, also make an "unplanned cameo". In an interview Rhett said he wants the video to "highlight amazing women in Nashville for all of the amazing things they've done around the world". Among those featured are women from Nashville's Thistle Farms as well as the founder of Love + One.

Charts

Weekly charts

Year-end charts

Certifications

References

2019 songs
2019 singles
Thomas Rhett songs
Songs written by Thomas Rhett
Songs written by Rhett Akins
Songs written by Julian Bunetta
Songs written by Jacob Kasher
Songs written by Ammar Malik
Song recordings produced by Dann Huff
Big Machine Records singles